This is a list of Malaysian football transfers for the 2018 first transfer window. Moves featuring Malaysia Super League, Malaysia Premier League and Malaysia FAM Cup club are listed.

The first transfer window began once clubs had concluded their final domestic fixture of the 2017 season, but many transfers will only officially go through on 1 December onwards because the majority of player contracts finish on 31 October.

The window opened on 20 November 2017 and closed on 11 February 2018.

2018 first transfers 
All clubs without a flag are Malaysian. Otherwise it will be stated.

Transfers

Loans

Unattached players

Notes

References

2018
Tranfers
Malaysia